Maliniec may refer to the following places:
Maliniec, Greater Poland Voivodeship (west-central Poland)
Maliniec, Lublin Voivodeship (east Poland)
Maliniec, West Pomeranian Voivodeship (north-west Poland)